Ireland have sent 65 competitors to the 2019 European Games, in Minsk, Belarus from 21 to 30 June 2019.

Medal summary

Archery

Recurve

Athletics

 Men's High jump: Nelvin Appiah-Konadu
 Men's Sprint Stephen Gaffney 
 Men's Hurdles: Gerard O'Donnell 
 Women's Javelin: Grace Casey
 Women's Hurdles: Sarah Lavin
 Women's Long Jump: Sophie Meredith (athletics) 
 Women's Sprint: Niamh Whelan
 Mixed 4x400m: Brandon Arrey, Andrew Mellon, Ciara Deely and Sinead Denny 
 Mixed Pursuit Relay: Conall Kirk, Paul White, Victoria Harris and Amy O'Donoghue

Badminton

Basketball (3x3)

Not participating this year.

Beach soccer

Not participating this year.

Boxing

Women:
 Kellie Harrington 
 Aoife O'Rourke
 Grainne Walsh 
 Michaela Walsh

Men:
 Tony Browne
 Regan Buckley
 Dean Gardiner
 Brendan Irvine
 James McGivern
 Kieran Molloy
 Michael Nevin
 Kurt Walker 
 Joseph Ward

Canoeing

 Canoe sprint: Jenny Egan and Ronan Hughes

Cycling

Men:
 Mark Downey
 Conor Dunne
 Robert-Jon McCarthy
 Ryan Mullen 
 Michael O'Loughlin 
 Felix English
 JB Murphy
 Marc Potts
 Fintan Ryan

Women:
 Alice Sharpe 
 Lydia Boylan
 Mia Griffin
 Lydia Gurley
 Shannon McCurley
 Orla Walsh 
 Robyn Stewart

Gymnastics

 Emma Slevin 
 Adam Steele

Judo

 Nathon Burns
 Ben Fletcher 
 Megan Fletcher

Karate

No participants this year.

Sambo

No participants this year.

Shooting

 Women’s Shotgun Trap: Aoife Gormally

Table tennis

No participants this year.

Taekwondo

No participants this year.

Wrestling

No participants this year.

References

Nations at the 2019 European Games
European Games
2019